Tang Wing Keung (born 10 January 1956) is a Hong Kong fencer. He competed in the individual and team épée events at the 1988 Summer Olympics.

References

External links
 

1956 births
Living people
Hong Kong male épée fencers
Olympic fencers of Hong Kong
Fencers at the 1988 Summer Olympics
Fencers at the 1978 Asian Games
Fencers at the 1986 Asian Games
Asian Games competitors for Hong Kong